Joseph David Michael Evison (born 14 November 2001) is an English cricketer. He made his first-class debut on 16 September 2019, for Nottinghamshire in the 2019 County Championship. In October 2019, he was named in the England under-19 cricket team's squad for a 50-over tri-series in the Caribbean. In December 2019, he was named in England's squad for the 2020 Under-19 Cricket World Cup. He made his List A debut on 25 July 2021, for Nottinghamshire  in the 2021 Royal London One-Day Cup. In April 2022, in the opening round of matches in the 2022 County Championship, Evison scored his maiden century in first-class cricket, with 109 not out against Sussex. He made his Twenty20 debut on 3 July 2022, for Nottinghamshire in the 2022 T20 Blast.

References

External links
 

2001 births
Living people
English cricketers
Nottinghamshire cricketers
Sportspeople from Peterborough
People educated at Stamford School